, married name , was a pop idol in the early '80s. She is now a Japanese TV personality, singer and actress, and is currently signed to Production No Title.

Early life 
Matsumoto was born in Ōta, Tokyo, Japan. She attended  from kindergarten through middle school and continued to Horikoshi High School a private high school in the Nakano section of Tokyo. She completed her studies at Toita Women's College also in the city.

Career 
Matsumoto debuted in the entertainment business in 1981 when she was 15 years old, after being scouted by the agency Bond Kikaku while shopping in Shinjuku. Dubbed "Toshihiko Tahara's little sister", her singing career was launched October the same year with the single "Sentimental Journey" which was an instant hit, making it to no. 9 on the Oricon Chart. The single went on to sell over 300,000 copies, and remain as her biggest hit.

In 1982, she was awarded the Newcomer Prize at the 24th Japan Record Awards., along with many other newcomer awards from various TV stations. On January 1, 1983, Matsumoto became the youngest artist to hold a concert in Nippon Budokan at the age of 17 years and 6 months. The record was broken that September by Sayuri Iwai, at 15 years and 1 month.

From 1984 to 1986, Matsumoto hosted the midnight TV show All Night Fuji, while steadily releasing four singles each year.

After the peak of her pop idol career in the late 80's, she shifted her focus onto becoming a TV presenter as well as doing other work, and was well received. In 1992, she starred in the Tokyo TV drama Kinono Watashi Ni Sayonara (Goodbye to the Old Me) Four years later she participated as a judge on Iron Chef. She teamed up with fellow idols Yū Hayami and Chiemi Hori in 2005 to form the unit Cutie Mommy, with whom she released two singles.

In 2009, she released Sweet 16 Box, a box set that compiled all of the albums from her idol career and a bonus CD and DVD. Included was her first new song in 19 years, titled , written by Ami Ozaki.

As a 30-year commemoration of her debut, in 2012 she held a concert at the Shinagawa Prince Hotel's Stellar Ball and released a best-of album which included a handshake ticket.

On January 13, 2016, while filming a travel programme with Hayami, both of them allegedly trespassed onto the track of the Sanin Main Line near Saga-Arashiyama Station in Kyoto without authorization and were almost prosecuted. Both Matsumoto and Hayami were heavily criticized by the media and held separate press conferences apologising after the incident were made public. After the situation was assessed, and both were acknowledged as unaware of the regulations, the charge was dropped.

Personal life 
In 1993, she married Japanese comedian Hiromi. She is the mother of two children.

Discography

Singles

Albums

Studio albums 
  (1981)
  (1982)
  (1982)
  (1983)
  (1983)
 Sugar Rain (1984)
  (1984)
  (1985)
  (1986)
  (1987)
 Private File (1989)
 Innocence (1989)
 MARiAGE (1991)

Compilation albums

Other songs 
 "BOYFRIEND A GOGO" (from Beautiful Katamari)

References

External links 
 Official website
 Profile at Production No Title's website deadlink 

1965 births
Horikoshi High School alumni
Japanese women singers
Japanese idols
Japanese television actresses
Japanese television personalities
Living people
People from Ōta, Tokyo
Singers from Tokyo